TD Bank, N.A. is an American national bank and the United States subsidiary of the multinational TD Bank Group. It operates primarily across the East Coast, in fifteen U.S. states and Washington, D.C. TD Bank is the seventh-largest U.S. bank by deposits and the 11th largest bank in the United States by total assets, resulting from a series of several mergers and acquisitions. TD Bank, N.A. is headquartered in Cherry Hill, New Jersey, a proximal suburb eight miles (13 km) outside Philadelphia.  TD Bank is a federally chartered bank, thus its trading name bears "N.A." letters.

History

It is a successor to the Portland Savings Bank, which later became Banknorth after a series of mergers with various other New England banks. The Canada-based TD Bank Group then became majority owner in 2004 and renamed it "TD Banknorth, N.A." by adding the Canadian bank's popular "TD" initials. On May 31, 2008, TD Bank Group acquired Commerce Bank, and merged it with TD Banknorth to form TD Bank, N.A., what is now the United States subsidiary of its Canadian parent company.

In 2010, TD Bank, N.A. acquired the South Financial Group and its 172 branches across the Carolinas and Florida. South Financial was the parent company of Carolina First, with branch locations in North and South Carolina and Mercantile Bank, with branch locations in Florida, for about $191 million. South Financial's branches were converted to the TD Bank name. 

In 2013, TD Bank, N.A. centralized its American headquarters in Cherry Hill, New Jersey, U.S.

In February 2016, TD Bank's consumer card division purchased the Nordstrom credit card unit for $2.2 billion.  The acquisition added Nordstrom to TD's growing folio of private-label cards that includes Target, NordicTrack, and Tourneau.

On October, 29, 2021, TD Bank, N.A. announced Leo Salom would succeed Greg Braca as the bank’s U.S. President & CEO. Salom had been leading TD’s wealth management and insurance business. Salom’s role change became effective Jan. 1, 2022.

On February 28, 2022, TD Bank, N.A. announced plans to acquire Memphis, Tennessee-based First Horizon Corporation for US$13.4 billion. The combined entity will be based in Cherry Hill, New Jersey, in the Philadelphia metropolitan area, and will constitute a Top 6 US bank. The deal is expected to close in 2023, pending approval by regulators in both the United States and Canada. The post-merger bank will have $600 billion in assets, potentially boosting its ranking to sixth-largest by deposits in the United States.

Legal actions and public controversies

2012 data breach
In October 2012, the Massachusetts attorney general announced that TD Bank misplaced unencrypted backup tapes with "extensive customer information, including Social Security numbers and bank account numbers." The bank initially refused to state how many customers were affected. After an inquiry by the attorney general, it stated 267,000 customers. The bank waited more than six months to notify customers.

TCPA class action lawsuit
In October 2015, a class action lawsuit was filed against TD Bank claiming that it violated the Telephone Consumer Protection Act of 1991. The lawsuit alleged the bank called consumers up to 10 times per day. As of July 3, 2017, all but one of the claims were dismissed by Judge Jerome B. Simandle.

Coin-count machine lawsuit
In 2016, the bank was sued for allegations that their coin counting machines, "Penny Arcades," were inaccurately counting coins. The lawsuit estimates that 26 cents out of every $100 was not counted, totaling to $9 million.

Financial penalties 
Many cases of financial penalties against the company do feature mitigating factors including accidental human error at branches due to customers presenting fraudulent information; however, the company has been assessed penalties in excess of $197 million since the year 2000 for consumer, banking, investor protection, wage and privacy violations.

Sponsorships

In 2005, TD Banknorth announced it purchased the naming rights of what is currently the TD Garden, home of the Boston Celtics and Boston Bruins sports teams.

When TD Bank bought Commerce Bancorp in 2009, the company became title sponsor of the TD Bank Ballpark, home of the Somerset Patriots.

On August 22, 2019, TD announced its partnership with The Shed, the new arts center on Manhattan's Far West Side, as lead sponsor of the "Open Call" artist commissioning program

On November 4, 2019, TD announced an extension of their long standing Canadian partnership with the Toronto Blue Jays into the United States with the naming rights to the team's spring training home in Dunedin, FL., to be renamed TD Ballpark.

See also

TD Ameritrade Park Omaha (Nebraska)

Notes

External links
 

Toronto-Dominion Bank
Cherry Hill, New Jersey
Companies based in Camden County, New Jersey
Banks based in New Jersey
Banks based in Maine
Economy of the Northeastern United States
American companies established in 1852
Banks established in 1852
1852 establishments in Maine
American subsidiaries of foreign companies
2008 mergers and acquisitions